The 1935–36 Swiss National Ice Hockey Championship was the 26th edition of the national ice hockey championship in Switzerland. Zürcher SC won the championship by defeating HC Davos in the final.

First round

Western Series

Eastern Series

Central Series 1

Central Series 2

Final game 
 Akademischer EHC Zürich - SC Bern 2:1

Playoffs

Semifinals 
 HC Davos - HC Chateaux-d'Oex
 Zürcher SC - Akademischer EHC Zürich 2:1

Final 
 Zürcher SC - HC Davos 1:0 OT

External links 
Swiss Ice Hockey Federation – All-time results

Swiss
National